HD 20104 (HR 967) is a visual binary in the northern circumpolar constellation Camelopardalis. The system has a combined apparent magnitude of 6.41, making it near naked eye visibility.

The system's stars have masses twice that of the Sun and effective temperatures ranging from 8,100 to 8,700 K, typical of stars their type. HD 20104 has an age of 313 million years.

References

Camelopardalis (constellation)
A-type main-sequence stars
Binary stars
020104
0967
BD+65 388
015309